Cecil Burgess (1888–1956) was a Canadian architect. He was born in Walkden, Lancashire, England on 8 July 1888. He was educated Walkden, Lancashire, England. He articled to Henry Kirkby, an architect in Manchester, England. Cecil Burgess arrived in Ottawa, Ontario with his parents in 1905. He married Violet Hervey from Round Hill, Nova Scotia, in 1913. The couple had a son, Bernard W. Burgess of Montreal, and a daughter, Mrs. Barbara Joyce Greenwood.

He was a prominent Ottawa architect. At various times, he lived at 34 Echo Drive and at 25 Bellwood in Ottawa South. He was a charter member of the Ottawa Kiwanis Club. Cecil Burgess was a philanthropist. He served as a director of the Ottawa Boys' Club from 1939 to 1956. He died in hospital in Ottawa, Ontario on July 23, 1956 at 68 after a short illness. His funeral was held at  Trinity Anglican Church, one of his works. The service was conducted by Rev. Wilfred Bradley, assisted by. Archdeacon J. C. Anderson.

He worked and partner with several prominent architects including his former employer Arthur Weeks, Richard Millson, and Edwin Gardner. During the Second World War, Burgess moved to Nova Scotia where he oversaw the construction of 80 buildings for the naval base  before returning to Ottawa. Many of Burgess buildings reflected his interest in modern Art-Deco architecture. He used a Modern Classicism style (also known as Stripped Classicism) with elegant dashes of Art Deco in many of his later works in Ottawa.

Career
He worked as a draughtsman and assistant for the firm of Weeks and Keefer in Ottawa 1908–1910. He worked on his own under the company name of Burgess & Co. 1910–1914. He partnered with Arthur L. B. Weeks, under the company name of Weeks and Burgess 1914. Burgess partnered with Richard H. Millson, under the company name of Millson & Burgess 1915–1922. Albert James Hazelgrove joined the partnership under the company name of Millson, Burgess & Hazelgrove 1923–24. He partnered with Richard H. Millson, under the company name of Millson & Burgess 1925–26. Burgess was alone under the company name of C. Burgess 1927–33; from 1927, Burgess worked with an associate Edwin Alexander Gardner. Burgess partnered with Edwin Alexander Gardner under the company name of Burgess and Gardner 1934–42. In 1942 Gardner entered the federal public service; Gardner became chief architect at the Department of Public Works from 1952 to 1963. Cecil Burgess was alone under the company name of C. Burgess 1945–51. He partnered with J. Malcolm McLean under the company name of Burgess and McLean 1951–1958. Murdoch MacPhadyen became a partner under the company name of Burgess, McLean and MacPhadyen 1958–1967. After Burgess died in 1956, J. Malcolm McLean and Murdoch MacPhadyen remained sole associates under the company name McLean and MacPhadyen.

Works
Burgess designed buildings in the greater Ottawa region, with a few projects in Rockliffe Park, Renfrew, Perth, North Bay or Cornwall, Ontario. A significant portion of the projects are new, renovations or modifications to existing private dwellings, office buildings, churches for private clients or institutions such as government departments, hospitals, school boards.

He designed dozens of churches, schools, homes, apartments and civic buildings. Burgess notable works in Ottawa includes The Coliseum at Lansdowne Park, Ashbury College, the Bank of Montreal (today Hartmen's Independent Grocer) and No. 11 Fire Hall on Parkdale Ave in Hintonburg. The National Archives of Canada holds a large collection of drawings for more than 250 projects executed by Burgess and the various firms in which he practised from 1910 until 1962. The Burgess firm handled some 5O school projects from Deep River, Ontario to Cornwall, Ontario.

Burgess & Co. (1910–1914)
United Brothers Jewish Synagogue, Rideau Street near Chapel Street, 1912; demol. c. 1960 
Residence Monkland Ave., Ottawa for Messrs. Shuttleworth & Black, Ottawa, Ontario. 1910

Weeks and Burgess (1914–1915)
Ashbury College, 
Ottawa Hunt and Golf Club 
Rivermead Golf Club House, 
Rosenthal Building 
Birks Building on Sparks Street, 
Fire Hall No.5 on King Edward 
Bank of Montreal at Somerset and Bank (now part of the Hartman's Metro grocery store).

Burgess and Millson (1915–1922)
St. Andrew's Presbyterian Church (1927) Perth, Ontario, which was built in the Gothic Revival design, has been recognized for its heritage value by the Town of Perth on 12 May 1992, By-law 2979 
Hull Iron and Steel Foundry Office (1915), 205 Montcalm Street, Hull, Quebec, was formally Recognized on 1993/12/16 as a Federal Heritage Building.
Canadian Battlefields Memorial (1921) finalist for competition entry of Gothic stone tower
the Larocque Department Store, Rideau and Dalhousie, Ottawa; 
the Plant Bath, Somerset and Preston, Ottawa; 
the Blackburn Building, Spark Street, Ottawa; 
Fire Hall No.11, Parkdale Avenue, Ottawa; 
St. John Anglican Church in Kars, Ontario; 
Holy Name Catholic Church in Pembroke, Ontario; 
Holy Name Catholic School in  Pembroke, Ontario; 
the Carnegie Library in Renfrew, Ontario.

Millson, Burgess, & Hazelgrove (1923–24) 
 Lansdowne Park, Howick Hall (Later The Coliseum), Exhibition Grounds, Bank Street At Holmwood Avenue, 1926, Art Deco civic building  in the Chicago Style; The rapid construction was due to the innovative use of structural steel and reinforced concrete to create an internal building skeleton upon which was fixed a cladding of bricks and glazed windows.
Parkdale Fire Station (1924), Fire Station 11, 424 Parkdale Avenue, which incorporates some Modern Classical style elements, was formally recognized as one of Canada's Historic Places 1996/02/07.

Millson & Burgess (1925–26)

C. Burgess (1927–1933)
170 Clemow, (1926–7), now the High Commission for Cameroon, formerly residence of an Ottawa Mayor Frank Plant (1884–1952) 
Palace Court Apartments, Elgin Street At Mcleod Street, For S. Miller, 1927–28 
Elmdale Public School, Iona Street, 1928 
Residence For W.H. Dwyer, Clemow Avenue, 1929 
Residence For E. Keith Davidson, Mariposa Road, At Manor Avenue, 1929 
St. Matthew's Anglican Church (Ottawa), Chapel and Parish Hall 1929–1930 on 217 First Avenue at Bank, Gothic Revival, Stripped Classicism Neo Gothic early version of Art Deco 
Windsor Arms Apartments 150 Argyle, For Stuart Christie, 1929 Stripped Classicism early version of Art Deco
The Duncannon Apartments, 216 Metcalfe Street, 1931, Stripped Classicism early version of Art Deco
Val Cartier Apartments, Cartier Street At Somerset Street West, 1931 Stripped Classicism early version of Art Deco
Trafalgar Apartments, Metcalfe Street At Gladstone Avenue, For Wolf Shenkman, 1931 Stripped Classicism early version of Art Deco 
Residence For Frank H. Plant, 1927 Clemow Avenue, 
St. Andrew's Presbyterian Church, 1927–28 Perth, Ont., 
Presbyterian Church, Pembroke Street At Henry Street, Pembroke, Ontario, 1928 
The Balderson Theatre, Perth, Ontario, Major Alterations 1930 
Dominion House Furniture Co., Bank Street At Gloucester Street, Retail Store, 1933 
Residence For Dr. Joseph P. Gilhooly, Range Road, 1933–34

Burgess & Gardner (1934–1942)
Postal Terminal Building on Besserer Street, (1935–6)  6-storey Art Deco post office was demolished to make way for the Rideau Centre.

Hockey rink, Arnprior, Ontario, 1946–47
Allison Gardens hockey rink, Sackville, Nova Scotia, 1947 
residence for Keith Davidson, 1936 Rockliffe Park, Ottawa
two residences for unidentified clients, Arnprior, Ontario
residence for Col. Edward R. McNeill, Sherwood Drive, Ottawa 1942 
Bethany Hope Centre, 1140 Wellington Street West, 1941, an addition was added to the rear of the building to provide extra living space for the tenants
Hulse, Playfair & McGarry Funeral Home Ltd, 315 McLeod major addition 1930s, Tudor Revival building

World War II
HMCS Cornwallis naval base (80 buildings), Deep Brook, Nova Scotia (1942–1944)

C. Burgess & Co. (1945–1951)
Winchester General Hospital, Winchester, Ontario, 1947 
Trinity Anglican Church, Bank Street at Cameron Avenue, post-fire reconstruction, 1947–48 
Cornwall public school, S.S. No. 2, Cornwall, Ontario, addition, 1947 
Parkdale United Church, Parkdale Avenue at Gladstone Avenue, major addition, 1949 
South Hull Protestant School, Hull, Quebec 1949 
St. Peter's Lutheran Church, Ottawa, Lyon Street at Nepean Street, 1950–52 
Manor Park Public School, Braemar Street, Manor Park, Ottawa 1950 
Perth public school, Perth, Ontario, 1950 
Shawville High School, Shawville, Quebec, 1950 
Minto Skating Club Rink, Henderson Avenue, rebuilding of the rink, 1950 
Arnprior High School, major addition Arnprior, Ontario, 1950 
War Memorial Rink, Campbellton, New Brunswick, 1950 
Grant Public School, 2720 Richmond Road East, major renovation, 1949

Burgess and McLean (1952–58)
273 Donald Street (1957), Ottawa, Ontario 
Forintek Building complex, 800 Montreal Road, 1958. Designated by The Federal Heritage Buildings Review Office (FHBRO) in 1997 as "recognized."

Burgess, McLean and MacPhadyen (1958–1967)
Whitney Buildings at the Royal Ottawa Hospital 
Élisabeth-Bruyère Health Centre, Ottawa General Hospital
Eastern Ontario Institute of Technology, Woodroffe Avenue, south of Baseline Road, (later referred to as the Woodroffe campus of Algonquin College), 1964
Eastern Ontario Institute of Technology, Lees Aveouenear the Rideau river, (later referred to as the Rideau campus of Algonquin College), now the University of Ottawa, $3,750,000; 1964
Ottawa Teachers' College, Alta Vista Drive, near Ridgemont High School, at Heron Road; 1964 
Porter's Island Home for the Aged, 1963 with John Le-Fort and Sam Gitlerman 
Mutual Life of Canada, 80 Argyle Avenue, Queensview Construction and Development, Ltd. 
New Controlled Environment Facility at Carleton University 
Dominion Bureau of Statistics Tower in Tunney's Pasture, Scott at Holland. 
St. Aidan's Anglican Church, Ottawa 
St. David's Presbyterian Church, Ottawa 
St. Martin's Presbyterian Church, Ottawa 
St Timothy's Presbyterian Church, Alta Vista Drive. contemporary style, 1963 
Trinity St. Andrews Church in Renfrew. 
St. Stephen's Anglican Church (Ottawa)
Britannia United Church, Pinecrest Road, Ottawa 
Morison Public School, Deep River Ontario, major addition of 6 classrooms 1967
Keys Public School, Deep River Ontario, major addition 1967 Auditorium, Gymnasium, Classroom, laboratory, Shop

Hawthorne Public School, St Laurent Boulevard, Ottawa, 1963 built by C. A. Johannsen and Sons Ltd.
Ottawa Youth Services Bureau Boys' Residence (1966), 2887 Riverside Drive, $75,000  
Pinecrest Recreation Center, centennial swimming pool, Pinecrest Road, 1966 
Field House, L. D. Zuccarini building, S67.000, Park-centre on the Belfast Road and Kirchoffer 

https://www.newspapers.com/newspage/44456410/

References 

1888 births
1967 deaths
Canadian architects
English emigrants to Canada
People from Ottawa
Architects from Lancashire